Gibberula elvirae is a species of sea snail, a marine gastropod mollusk, in the family Cystiscidae.

References

elvirae
Gastropods described in 2012
Cystiscidae